Trans FX is an American music group formed in 2011 by songwriters Chris McDonnell and Scott Young in Olympia, Washington. They have released five albums , and continue to operate a revolving door, communal band, based in Olympia. Their sound has often been compared to Lou Reed, Happy Mondays, Brian Eno, Primal Scream, and The Jesus and Mary Chain. Consistent in their output, but not in their label, the band continues to make conceptual recordings imitating life as industry, aimed at a better understanding of immediacy in the 21st century.

History 
Created in McDonnell's garage studio, then Transfix, started as a self-proclaimed Death Rock band, consisting of members Scott Young (keyboards, vocals), Chris McDonnell (guitar/vocals), Nora McKinnon (drums), and Steve Sharrett (bass). The band wrote and recorded a full-length album with Olympia-based recording, Captain Tripps Ballsington, released on Dutch Tilt records in the summer of 2013. The band's second studio album, entitled Into The Blu (also recorded with Capt. Tripps) was released on K Records in the fall of 2015. Into The Blu was a change in sound and direction, as McDonnell and Young moved towards electronic pop and abbreviated their name to the current moniker, Trans FX. Young then left the band to pursue an art career, leaving McDonnell the nucleus of a perpetually shifting constellation of members. After touring the East Coast with Danish band, and Marching Church the band continued to make two more records and several small label releases between 2015 and 2017. In 2017, the band collaborated with fellow Olympians CC Dust, to record the CCFX EP, released on DFA Records.

Discography

Full albums 
 Transfix S/T (2013, Dutch Tilt)
 Into The Blu (2015, Perennial/K Records)
 The Clearing (2016, Sister Cylinder)
 Gaslit (2017, Joker's Got A Posse)
 The Showroom Dummies (2018, JGAP)
 music, drugs, technology & popular desire (2021, Joker's Got A Posse)

EPs and singles 
 Like A Glove/New Fix 7 (2013, Unwound Records)
 Death is so Relaxing... EP (2014, Ascetic House)
 When You See The Light Cass. Single (2014, Perennial)
 KAG//TFX- Fugue 7 (2015, Perennial)
 Hard Pill To Swallow EP (2017, Joker's Got A Posse)

Collaborations 
 CCFX EP (2017, DFA Records)

References

External links 
 Official website

Musical groups from Olympia, Washington